Nathaniel Willie Dorsey, III (born September 9, 1983), is a former American football offensive tackle. He was originally drafted by the Minnesota Vikings in the fourth round of the 2004 NFL Draft. He played college football at Georgia Tech.

High School years
Dorsey attended St. Augustine High.

College career
Dorsey played college football at Georgia Tech. He majored in management.

Professional career

2004
He was selected by the Minnesota Vikings in the fourth round (115th overall) in the 2004 NFL Draft. He played in 13 games with seven starts in his rookie season and made his NFL debut versus the Chicago Bears on September 26.

2005
On September 4, 2005, he was traded to the Cleveland Browns and appeared in nine games.

2006
He played in 13 games with two starts for the Browns.

2007
He played in 5 games for the Browns.

External links
Georgia Tech Yellow Jackets bio
Cleveland Browns bio

Living people
1983 births
St. Augustine High School (New Orleans) alumni
American football offensive tackles
Cleveland Browns players
Georgia Tech Yellow Jackets football players
Minnesota Vikings players